Glyphipterix calliscopa is a species of sedge moth in the genus Glyphipterix. It was described by Oswald Bertram Lower in 1905. It is found in Australia, including Victoria and Queensland.

References

Moths described in 1905
Glyphipterigidae
Moths of Australia